Hackley Head (otherwise Forvie Ness) is a headland in Aberdeenshire, northeast Scotland.

Hackley Head is located to the south of Hackley Bay and to the north of the Sands of Forvie and the Ythan estuary. The nearest village is Collieston.

External links 
Its page in the Gazetteer for Scotland

Landforms of Aberdeenshire
Headlands of Scotland